is a train station located in Ikeda, Osaka, but is on the border with Toyonaka to the south and Minoh to the east. It serves as a transfer point for the Hankyu Minoo Line on one side and on the other side is an express station on the Hankyu Takarazuka Line．The station has five platforms connected by tunnels, two for Osaka-Takarazuka service, and three for Minoo service.

The station is near to one of the three campuses of Osaka University, though the campus is physically located in neighbouring Toyonaka City. The station is surrounded by bars, karaoke boxes, and izakaya restaurants along with more traditional small-stall shopping streets.

The word Ishibashi literally means Stone Bridge, referring to the old stone street bridge immediately north of the station over a small river that serves as the northern end of the shopping area, which is called Akai hashi.

Layout
There are three platforms with five tracks on the ground level.

History
The station opened concurrently with the opening of the Takarazuka Line and the Mino-o Line on 10 March 1910. Since then the structure of the station as an interchange of the two lines has not been largely changed except for the stretched platforms.

On 25 June 1952, hours before the first scheduled train of the day, hundreds of protesters against the Korean War who left a meeting at the Osaka University campus thronged Ishibashi Station and forced station master to run a train to transport them to Osaka. After getting off the forcedly operated train at Hattori Station, they marched and burst into Suita Classification Yard of Japanese National Railways. As a result, more than one hundred people were arrested on charge of riot. The incident is called the Suita Incident.

On October 1, 2019, the station was renamed from Ishibashi to Ishibashi handai-mae,

Adjacent stations

|-
!colspan=5|Hankyu (HK-48)

See also
List of railway stations in Japan

References

External links
Ishibashi Station (Hankyu Railway)

Railway stations in Japan opened in 1910
Railway stations in Osaka Prefecture
Osaka University transportation